Daniel Nicholas Mosley, 4th Baron Ravensdale, 8th Baronet (born 10 October 1982), is a British hereditary peer and crossbench member of the House of Lords. He is an engineer, currently working as a project director for Atkins. His paternal great-grandfather was Oswald Mosley, leader and founder of the British Union of Fascists.

On 28 February 2017, he succeeded his grandfather, the novelist Nicholas Mosley (who did not use the titles) in the baronetcy and as Baron Ravensdale, a peerage created for his great-great-grandfather George Curzon, 1st Marquess Curzon of Kedleston.

Ravensdale became a member of the House of Lords in March 2019, after winning a crossbench hereditary peers' by-election.

Political views 
Ravensdale supported the Remain campaign in the 2016 United Kingdom European Union membership referendum however opposed a second referendum.

References

1982 births
Living people
Barons Ravensdale
Crossbench hereditary peers
Daniel
Alumni of the University of Sheffield
21st-century British engineers
Systems engineers
Mosley baronets
Hereditary peers elected under the House of Lords Act 1999